Goghin is a village in the Zoungou Department of Ganzourgou Province in central Burkina Faso. The village has a population of 320.

References

Populated places in the Plateau-Central Region
Ganzourgou Province